Chi Coltrane (born November 6, 1948) is an American rock/gospel singer, songwriter and pianist.

She first came to notice in 1972 with the single "Thunder and Lightning". Her 1973 song "Go Like Elijah" was a number one-hit in The Netherlands.

Career
Chi Coltrane began as a performer in Chicago. She made her overseas debut when she starred as guest star of the US at the International Rock Festival for 50,000 people in Rio de Janeiro. She returned to the U.S. where Clive Davis signed her to CBS/Sony. Her first hit was in the U.S.: "Thunder and Lightning"; hitting #1 in NYC and various cities across the United States; and reaching #17 nationwide. Coltrane had two top 40 hits in Germany, hitting #1 in the Netherlands and holding that position for a month with the original "Go Like Elijah."

Coltrane made many guest appearances on American Network TV specials, including NBC's The Tonight Show.

Coltrane appeared with The Who, The Eagles, Stevie Wonder, and Rod Stewart. During the 1970s and 1980s in America, Chi was once dubbed "The First Lady of Rock"; and in Europe, she was once given the title "Queen of Rock"; where she was also voted "Top Female Artist" for two consecutive years, and held the #1 position in the "Music Express Popularity" poll. Chi's lifetime work has garnered many awards and accolades, both in America and abroad, including the European Gold Hammer and Silver Hammer for top Female artist. In 1999 Chi was honored in Los Angeles.

Coltrane was listed in the European "100 Best Musicians of the CENTURY" list.  Rolling Stone described Coltrane as a "rip-snorting female vocalist/composer/producer whose performances are nothing less than searing."  Paul Buckmaster, referring to her new song "Yesterday, Today & Forever" said; "I had to stop a few times while working on the string arrangement of 'Yesterday, Today & Forever' because of the profound emotions it stirred up in me - it is that great of a song. I think this may be the most beautiful song I have ever heard."

Discography
Studio albums
 Chi Coltrane (1972)
 Let It Ride (1973)
 Road to Tomorrow (1977)
 Silk & Steel (1981)
 Ready to Roll (1983)
 The Message (1986)

References

External links

 Official Website
 
 

20th-century American women singers
21st-century American women singers
American women rock singers
American gospel singers
American women pianists
Living people
20th-century American singers
21st-century American singers
1948 births